Embassy of Ukraine in Vilnius is the diplomatic mission of Ukraine in Lithuania.

History 
Ukraine recognised independence of Lithuania on August 26, 1991. Lithuania recognised independence of Ukraine on December 4, 1991. Diplomatic relations were established on December 12, 1991. The Embassy of Ukraine in Lithuania was opened in August 1993. The Embassy is located in a building acquired by Ukraine in July 1994.

Ukraine has an embassy in Vilnius and 3 honorary consulates (in Klaipėda, Šalčininkai and Visaginas).

Ambassadors
 Siluyan Muzhilovsky (1649)
 Volodymyr Kedrovskiy (1919–1921)
 Mikhaylo Parashchuk (1921)
 Eugene Terletsky (1921–1923)
 Rostislav Bilodid (1992–1999)
 Valentyn Zaichuk (2000–2001)
 Mykola Derkach (2001–2004)
 Boris Klimchuk (2004–2008)
 Ihor Prokopchuk (2008–2010)
 Valery Zhovtenko (2011–2015)
 Volodymyr Yatsenkivsky (2015 -2021)
 Petro Beshta (2022- )

See also 
 Lithuania-Ukraine relations
 Foreign relations of Lithuania
 Foreign relations of Ukraine
 Diplomatic missions of Ukraine

References

External links 

 Embassy of Ukraine in Vilnius 

1993 establishments in Lithuania
Vilnius
Ukraine
Lithuania–Ukraine relations